Beyond our Ken is a radio comedy programme.

Beyond our Ken may also refer to:

Beyond Our Ken (2004 film), Hong Kong film
Beyond Our Ken (2008 film), Australian film